Yevgeni Solomonov (born May 9, 1990) is a Belarusian ice hockey player who is currently playing for Avtomobilist Yekaterinburg in the Kontinental Hockey League (KHL). He previously played in his native Belarus with HK Gomel of the Belarusian Extraliga.

Solomonov competed in the 2013 IIHF World Championship as a member of the Belarus men's national ice hockey team.

References

External links

1990 births
Living people
Avtomobilist Yekaterinburg players
Belarusian ice hockey forwards
HK Gomel players
Montreal Junior Hockey Club players
Sportspeople from Gomel